Reuben de Maid (born 24 March 2005) is a Welsh makeup artist and singer.

References

External links 

 
 

Living people
2005 births
Make-up artists
Welsh male singers